This is a list of rivers of the Isle of Man. It is organised geographically, taken anti-clockwise, from Douglas. Tributaries are listed down the page in an upstream direction.

 River Glass
 River Dhoo
 Greeba River
 Sulby River
 Baldwin River
 Groudle River
 Ballacottier River
 Laxey River
 Glen Roy
 Cornaa River
 Sulby River
 Glen Auldyn River
 The Lhen Trench
 Killane River
 River Neb
 Foxdale River
 Blaber River
 Glenmaye River
 Colby River
 Silver Burn
 Santon Burn
 Crogga River

See also
 Geography of the Isle of Man

Isle of Man
Rivers